Dolohmwar or Totolom is the third highest point of the Federated States of Micronesia, with an altitude of 760 metres (2,595 ft). Between the two is Ngihneni, within a meter or two of Nanlaud. All three are clearly depicted on the definitive USGS 1:25,000 scale topographic survey.

Dolohmwar is located on the island and in the state of Pohnpei.

See also
Geography of the Federated States of Micronesia

References

External links
 Dolohmwar, Micronesia, GeoNames.org.

Mountains of the Federated States of Micronesia